The men's 4 × 10 kilometre relay event of the FIS Nordic World Ski Championships 2015 was held on 27 February 2015.

Results
The race was started at 13:30.

References

Men's 4 x 10 kilometre relay